The Battle of Waterloo is an oil on canvas by William Sadler II made in June 1815.

It depicts the battle of Waterloo under the command of Napoleon Bonaparte against British forces under the Duke of Wellington, the Prussian troops under Gebhard Leberecht von Blücher, and soldiers from the Netherlands, the Province of Hanover, the Duchy of Nassau and the Principality of Brunswick-Wolfenbüttel.

References

1815 paintings
Irish paintings
Oil on canvas paintings
Waterloo campaign in paintings
Paintings of Napoleon
Cultural depictions of Arthur Wellesley, 1st Duke of Wellington